The 1966 GP Ouest-France was the 30th edition of the GP Ouest-France cycle race and was held on 30 August 1966. The race started and finished in Plouay.

General classification

References

1966
1966 in road cycling
1966 in French sport